Samart Group or simply Samart is a Thai group of companies which focuses on telecommunication, Consumer electronics industry. It is the parent company of Samart Corporation, Samart I-Mobile, Samart Telecom. It is listed in the Stock Exchange of Thailand.

The company was founded as Samart shop in 1955, a small electronic repair shop at Saraburi Province.

References

External links
 

Companies based in Bangkok
Companies listed on the Stock Exchange of Thailand